Raymond Kaleoalohapoinaʻoleohelemanu Kāne (October 2, 1925 - February 27, 2008), was one of Hawaii's acknowledged masters of the slack-key guitar. Born in Koloa, Kauaʻi, he grew up in Nanakuli on Oʻahu's Waiʻanae Coast where his stepfather worked as a fisherman.

Kāne's style was distinctive and deceptively simple. He played in a number of ki ho'alu tunings always plucking or brushing the strings with only the thumb and index finger of his right hand. He also played hammer-ons and pull-offs in a unique way; his finger moving up and out, instead of down and in, after striking a string. He emphasized that one must play and sing "from the heart". He was never flashy or fast. In Hawaiian, his sound is described as nahenahe (sweet sounding).

He was a recipient of a 1987 National Heritage Fellowship awarded by the National Endowment for the Arts, which is the United States government's highest honor in the folk and traditional arts.

Discography
Slack Key [the "Black and White Album"]  (1958)
Party Songs, Hawaiian Style, Vol. 2 (1959)
Nanakuli's Raymond Kane (1974)
Master of the Slack Key Guitar (1988)
Punahele (1994)
Hawaiʻi Aloha (1996)
Waʻahila (1998)
Hawaiian Sunset Music, Vol. 1 (1998)
Cherish the Mele of our Elders (with Elodia Kāne) (1998)
Maikaʻi No Blues (1999)
Tribute to Lena Machado (with Elodia Kāne) (1999)
Holoholo Slack Key (2000)
He Leo ʻOhana (with Elodia Kāne) (2000)

Notes

References

External links

Raymond Kane biography at Dancing Cats Records
Instructional video featuring Raymond Kane at The Guitar Workshop
Review of "That's Slack Key Guitar" film featuring Raymond Kane at the Taropatch.net online community
Slack-key guitar legend Raymond Kane dies

1925 births
2008 deaths
Slack-key guitarists
Guitarists from Hawaii
20th-century American guitarists
National Heritage Fellowship winners
People from Kauai County, Hawaii